Totally Hits was released on November 9, 1999. The album was the first volume in the Totally Hits series. It peaked at #14 on the US Billboard 200 album chart. The album contains five Billboard Hot 100 number-one hits: "No Scrubs", "Angel of Mine", "Smooth", "Believe", and "One Week".

Track listing
TLC – "No Scrubs" 3:39
Monica – "Angel of Mine" 4:11
Sugar Ray – "Someday" 4:05
Santana featuring Rob Thomas – "Smooth" 4:03
NSYNC – "(God Must Have Spent) A Little More Time on You" 4:40
Cher – "Believe" 3:59 
Deborah Cox – "Nobody's Supposed to Be Here" (Dance Mix) 4:15
Madonna – "Ray of Light" 4:36
Barenaked Ladies – "One Week" 2:52
Third Eye Blind – "Jumper" 4:33
Whitney Houston featuring Faith Evans and Kelly Price – "Heartbreak Hotel" 4:41
LFO – "Summer Girls" 4:18
Five – "When the Lights Go Out" 4:07
Brandy – "Almost Doesn't Count" 3:38
Usher – "You Make Me Wanna..." 3:41
Faith Hill – "This Kiss" 3:16
Sarah McLachlan – "Angel" 4:30
Kid Rock – "Bawitdaba" 4:26

Charts

Weekly charts

Year-end charts

Certifications

References

Totally Hits
1999 compilation albums